Schyman is a surname. Notable people with the surname include:

Garry Schyman (born 1954), American composer
Gudrun Schyman (born 1948), Swedish politician